James Eustace Radclyffe McDonagh FRCS (17 October 1881 – 14 February 1965) was a British surgeon and medical writer.

Biography

McDonagh was born on 17 October 1881 in London. He was educated at Bedford School and at the Medical College of St Bartholomew's Hospital. He qualified M.R.C.S and L.R.C.P. in 1906 and passed F.R.C.S. in 1909. He was a surgeon at the London Lock Hospital and a Fellow of the Royal College of Surgeons. In 1916, he was appointed Hunterian Professor at the Royal College of Surgeons. In 1929, he established the Nature of Disease Institute, remaining its director until 1959. Here he worked on the causes of syphilis, the common cold and influenza, reaching conclusions generally at odds with those commonly held. McDonagh prescribed his patients colon cleansing and a vegetarian diet. He treated Aldous Huxley.

The Nature of Disease Institute published their first report in 1948. McDonagh and his institute proposed a "unitary theory of disease" which was not accepted by the medical community. One review suggested that his theory was ill-defined, implausible and was an example of eccentric literature.

McDonagh retired in 1959 and died on 14 February 1965 in Stowmarket, Suffolk.

Publications

Textbook on Venereal Diseases, 1915 and 1920 
Venereal Diseases: Their Clinical Aspect and Treatment, 1920
The Nature of Disease (three volumes), 1924–1927–1931 
The Nature of Disease (The British Medical Journal), 1929
The Nature of Disease Journal (three volumes), 1932–1934
The Common Cold and Influenza, 1936
The Universe Through Medicine, 1940
The Nature of Disease To Date, 1946
The Nature of Disease Institute's First, Second and Third Annual Reports, 1948, 1949 and 1951
The Universe in the Making, 1948
A Further Study in the Nature of Disease, 1954
A Final Study in the Nature of Disease, 1959
The Nature of the Universe, Health and Disease, 1963
Protein: The Basis of All Life, 1966.

References

External links
 

1881 births
1965 deaths
20th-century English medical doctors
20th-century surgeons
Alternative detoxification promoters
Alumni of the Medical College of St Bartholomew's Hospital
English medical writers
English surgeons
Fellows of the Royal College of Surgeons
People educated at Bedford School